LinuxFocus was a bi-monthly webzine covering Linux. It was part of the Linux Documentation Project, and a sister webzine of the Linux Gazette. Each issue was published in a number of languages and was distributed free.

History and profile
LinuxFocus was started in November 1997 by Miguel Angel Sepulveda, primarily as a resource for Linux users in non-English speaking countries. Later, Guido Socher became project leader. The last article was published in 2005.

LinuxFocus is issued under the terms of the GNU Free Documentation License.

See also
 Computer magazine

References

External links 
 LinuxFocus

Bimonthly magazines published in the United States
Online magazines published in the United States
Defunct computer magazines published in the United States
Free magazines
Linux magazines
Magazines established in 1997
Magazines disestablished in 2005
Multilingual magazines